The Bulgarian Eparchy of Saint John XXIII of Sofia is the fourth, so far last and sole jurisdiction, covering Bulgaria, of the Bulgarian Greek Catholic Church (Eastern Catholic, using the Byzantine Rite in Bulgarian language).

Its cathedral episcopal see is the Cathedral of the Dormition (Катедрала Успение Богородично Катедрала Успение Богородично), in Bulgaria's capital Sofia, which also has a Latin Catholic diocesan see.

History 
It was established in 1926 as Apostolic Exarchate of Sofia, on Bulgarian territory split off from the suppressed Bulgarian Catholic Apostolic Vicariate of Constantinople and both its daughters Bulgarian Catholic Apostolic Vicariate of Macedonia and Bulgarian Catholic Apostolic Vicariate of Thrace (which also covered Greece, Turkey and Macedonia), reuniting the original Balkanic jurisdiction.

Statistics 
As per 2014, it pastorally served 10,000 Bulgarian (Byzantine Rite) Catholics in 20 parishes with 17 priests (4 diocesan, 13 religious), 42 lay religious (15 brothers, 27 sisters) and 1 seminarian.

Ordinaries 
(all Bulgarian Rite)

Apostolic Exarchs of Sofia 
 Kiril Kurtev first time (1926.07.31 – 1942 see below), Titular Bishop of Briula (1926.07.31 – death 1971.03.09)
 Ivan Garufaloff, Resurrectionists (C.R.) (1942.07.06 – 1951.08.07)
 Kyril Stefan Kurteff again (see above 1951.04.27 – death 1971.03.09)
 Metodi Dimitrov Stratiev, Assumptionists (A.A.) (1971.03.09 – 1995.09.05), Titular Bishop of Diocletianopolis in Thracia (1963.04.28 – death 2006.05.12), also President of Episcopal Conference of Bulgaria (1970 – 1995); succeeded as former Coadjutor Apostolic Exarch of Sofia of the Bulgarians (Bulgaria) (1963.04.28 – 1971.03.09)
 Christo Proykov (1995.09.05 – 2019.10.11), Titular Bishop of Briula (1993.12.18 – ...), also President of Episcopal Conference of Bulgaria (1995 – ...); succeeded as former Coadjutor Apostolic Exarch of Sofia of the Bulgarians (Bulgaria) (1993.12.18 – 1995.09.05).

Bishops of Sofia
 Christo Proykov (2019.10.11) - incumbent

See also 
 List of Catholic dioceses in Bulgaria
 Catholic Church in Bulgaria

References

Sources and external links 
 GCatholic, with Google satellite photo - data for all sections; with incumbent bio links
 GCatholic - Cathedral of the Dormition of the Blessed Virgin Mary
 Catholic Hierarchy: Apostolic Exarchate of Sofia (Bulgarian) 

Bulgarian Greek Catholic Church
Apostolic exarchates
Religious organizations established in 1926
1926 establishments in Bulgaria
Eastern Catholic dioceses in Europe
Catholic dioceses in Bulgaria